Neolithic ashmounds (sometimes termed as cinder mounds) are man-made landscape features found in some parts of southern India (chiefly around Bellary) that have been dated to the Neolithic period (3000 to 1200 BC). They have been a puzzle for long and have been the subject of many conjectures and scientific studies. They are believed to be of ritual significance and produced by early pastoral and agricultural communities by the burning of wood, dung and animal matter. Hundreds of ashmound sites have been identified and many have a low perimeter embankment and some have holes that may have held posts.

These ashmounds were traditionally given mythological explanations as the burnt remains of rakshasas described in epics like the Mahabharata. A scientific explanation was first attempted by T. J. Newbold who sent notes on Būdigunta, one of the largest such mounds, to James Prinsep who published it in the Journal of the Asiatic Society of Bengal in 1836. Newbold suggested that these were volcanic scoriae as the masses had a glassy surface and gave a hollow sound when struck. He was initially of the opinion that it appeared as if of volcanic origin although lacking any other evidence for it. He also pointed out that furnaces around the country did not produce such scoriae or slag. Newbold also pointed to Buchanan Hamilton's notes on the Rajmahal hills where he had described calcareous remains that the locals referred to as asurhar or giant's bones. Cavelly Venkata Lachmia (one of Colin Mackenzie's fellow researchers and president of the Madras Hindu Literary Society) wrote to Newbold that he had gathered theories these were remains of religious sacrifices made in the past or from funerals of past battles. Lachmia also pointed out that he had seen many other places around Mysore and many of these other places like Budihal and Buditippa had the prefix būdi referring to "ash". Budigunta near Bellary was said to be the largest and recorded as being 46 feet in height and 420 feet in circumference. Robert Sewell conjectured that the region was once densely forested and considered several possible explanations including furnaces. He also had the material examined and it was declared that it could not have come from furnaces or brick kilns. The burning of animal matter was considered as one possible source. He also pointed out that these could have been the result of large pyres where the wives of kings committed sati.

Robert Bruce Foote examined Budikanama in 1872 and suggested that these mounds were produced by burning dung and suggested a similarity to zaribas in Africa. Around the same time two amateur archaeologists dug a mound in Kupgal and found bones, pottery, stone axes and other artefacts. Allchin in 1963 made an analysis of all the theories and pointed out that rainfall was higher in the region during the Neolithic and that these may been forested regions which were burnt down for livestock.

Archaeological studies have continued into recent times. Some of the plant remains have been identified and millet cultivation may have been important. Two staple millets Brachiaria ramosa and Setaria verticillata which are not common in modern cultivation were found in several sites while the commonest legumes were Vigna radiata and Macrotyloma uniflorum. The animal remains are mainly of cattle, buffalo and pig (whether wild or domesticated, is not easy to determine).

References 

Ashmounds
Archaeology of India